"Life Is a Song Worth Singing" is a song written by Thom Bell and Linda Creed. It was notably recorded by American Johnny Mathis on his 1973 album, I'm Coming Home, released by Columbia Records. The song was released as the second single from the album, peaking at No. 8 on the Billboard Adult Contemporary chart and No. 54 on the Billboard Hot 100.

The song has also been recorded by the Sandpipers (1976), and is the title track of Teddy Pendergrass' second studio album released in 1978.

Chart performance

References

1973 singles
Columbia Records singles
1973 songs
Johnny Mathis songs
Teddy Pendergrass songs
The Sandpipers songs
Songs written by Linda Creed
Songs written by Thom Bell